The Boise Yankees were a minor league baseball team in the western United States, based in Boise, Idaho. They played in the Class C Pioneer League in 1952 and 1953 as an affiliate of the New York Yankees, and their home venue was Joe Devine Airway Park, named for the late Yankee scout Joe Devine in 1952.

History
The team was previously known as the unaffiliated Boise Pilots from 1939 to 1951 (except for three years during World War II when the league did not operate), while the Yankees' affiliates in the Pioneer League were previously the Twin Falls Cowboys (1946–51) and the Idaho Falls Russets (1940–41). The Yankees pulled out of the Pioneer League and the western U.S. after the 1953 season. The Boise team's name reverted to Pilots for 1954, then was the Boise Braves (affiliated with the Milwaukee Braves) from 1955 to 1963.

A notable Boise Yankee was future country music star Charley Pride.

Season records

Notable players
Woodie Held
Ken Hunt
Johnny James
Bob Martyn
Charley Pride

See also
Boise Yankees players

References

External links
Baseball Reference – Boise teams

Defunct Pioneer League (baseball) teams
Baseball teams established in 1952
Professional baseball teams in Idaho
New York Yankees minor league affiliates
1952 establishments in Idaho
Baseball teams disestablished in 1953
1953 disestablishments in Idaho
Sports in Boise, Idaho
Defunct baseball teams in Idaho